Albula virgata
is a species of marine fish found in the Hawaiian Islands. It is known commonly as the longjaw bonefish.

Taxonomy
Bonefish were once believed to be a single species with a global distribution, however 9 different species have since been identified. There are three identified species in the Atlantic and six in the Pacific.

Albula virgata was first described by the American ichthyologist David Starr Jordan and his son Edward Knight Jordan in 1922. It has a somewhat convoluted nomenclatural history. It was originally named Esox argenteus, but that name was already in use for the giant kokopu, and it was later renamed Albula forsteri. However, Forster's taxon is in a genus different than the giant kokopu, and thus Forster's name still stands.

For decades, Albula virgata was considered a synonym of either Albula vulpes or Albula neoguinaica. It was eventually recognized as a species distinct from Albula argentea.

Description
Albula virgata is similar to A. argentea and A. oligolepis in length of the upper jaw, but differs in having fewer vertebrae and lateral-line scales, as well as having the tip of pelvic fin
reaching beyond anterior edge of anus.

Distribution
Albula virgata is known only from the Hawaiian Islands. They are thought to be restricted to shallow sand flats, which are a rare and fragmented habitat type in the Hawaiian Islands.

References

Albuliformes
Endemic fauna of Hawaii
Fish of Hawaii
Taxa named by David Starr Jordan
Fish described in 1922